Pokrajina št. 2 (Landscape No. 2) is a 2008 Slovenian film directed by Vinko Möderndorfer. The film appeared at the 65th Venice International Film Festival. It won the best film award at the 11th Slovenian Film Festival.

The film deals with crimes by the Yugoslav Partisans in 1945 in post-World War II Slovenia.

References

External links
 
 

Slovenian drama films
2008 films